Daft Punk Unchained is an Anglo-French documentary that was televised on 24 June 2015 in France and on 9 February 2016 in the United Kingdom. It documents the rise to fame and personal lives of Daft Punk members Guy-Manuel de Homem-Christo and Thomas Bangalter and their pioneering influence on electronic music.

The documentary runs chronologically through the artists' early years before their foundation of Daft Punk, up to the release of their 2013 album Random Access Memories and the subsequent Grammy Award that the duo received for it.

The film combines rare archive footage with interviews with Daft Punk's closest collaborators, including Pharrell Williams, Giorgio Moroder, Nile Rodgers, Skrillex, Kanye West and Michel Gondry.

No new footage of Daft Punk was shot for the documentary.

References

External links

BBC television documentaries
2016 in British television